Elvedin Varupa (16 November 1975 – 1 August 2015) was a Bosnian professional footballer who played as a left-back.

Club career
He played in over 400 league games and in about 700 games in all competitions for Travnik, whose captain he was from 2004 to 2014. Varupa is regarded as a legend of the Bosnian Premier League.

After finishing his playing career, he held the position of coach in the youth team of Travnik from 2014 until his sudden death on 1 August 2015.

Personal life
He was the younger brother of former FK Sarajevo player Vejsil Varupa.

Death
Varupa died suddenly on 1 August 2015 in his hometown of Vitez, Bosnia and Herzegovina at the age of 39. He was buried at the "Grbavica" Cemetery near Vitez on 2 August 2015, one day after his death.

Honours

Player
Travnik
First League of FBiH: 2002–03, 2006–07

References

External links
Elvedin Varupa at Soccerway

1975 births
2015 deaths
People from Vitez
Bosnia and Herzegovina footballers
Bosnia and Herzegovina expatriate footballers
Expatriate footballers in Croatia
First Football League (Croatia) players
Premier League of Bosnia and Herzegovina players
First League of the Federation of Bosnia and Herzegovina players
HNK Suhopolje players 
NK Travnik players
Association football fullbacks